Ehsan Ali Khan (1 January 1931 – 10 March 2017) is a Bangladeshi politician in Chapai Nawabganj District. He was elected a member of parliament from Undivided Rajshahi-3 in 1979 and from Chapai Nawabganj-3 in 1988. He was the organizer of the Liberation War of Bangladesh.

Early life 
Ehsan Ali Khan was born on 1 January 1931 in Chapai Nawabganj District. Her father is Antaz Ali Khan and mother Ayesha Khanam.

Career 
Ehsan Ali Khan was the organizer of the Liberation War of Bangladesh. He was elected a member of parliament from Undivided Rajshahi-3 a Bangladesh Nationalist Party candidate in 1979 Bangladeshi general election and from Chapai Nawabganj-3 a Combined Opposition Parties candidate in 1988 Bangladeshi general election.

Death 
Ehsan Ali Khan died on 10 March 2017.

References 

1931 births
2017 deaths
People from Chapai Nawabganj district
Bangladesh Nationalist Party politicians
2nd Jatiya Sangsad members
4th Jatiya Sangsad members